O. laeta may refer to:

 Oeneis laeta, an Asian butterfly
 Olea laeta, an evergreen native to southeastern North America
 Orchis laeta, a herbaceous plant